Frederick Handel Hassall (11 August 1864 – 14 February 1945) was an English cricketer active from 1894 to 1902 who played first-class cricket for Leicestershire and minor counties cricket for Staffordshire. He was born in Nantwich and died in Leicester.

A right-handed batsman and bowled right-arm medium pace bowler, Hassall played in four first-class matches for Leicestershire in 1894, including their maiden first-class fixture against Essex at Leyton. He scored 57 runs with a highest score of 20. He played minor counties cricket for Staffordshire from 1898 to 1902, making 21 appearances.

Notes

External links
Frederick Hassall at ESPNcricinfo
Frederick Hassall at CricketArchive

1864 births
1945 deaths
People from Nantwich
English cricketers
Leicestershire cricketers
Staffordshire cricketers
Cricketers from Cheshire